LTAE may refer to:
 Akıncı Air Base
 Low-specificity L-threonine aldolase, an enzyme